Once Upon a Time in Shaolin is the seventh studio album by the American hip hop group Wu-Tang Clan. It was limited to a single copy sold in 2015, and is the most expensive work of music ever sold.

The album was recorded in secret over six years. A single two-CD copy was pressed in 2014 and stored in a secured vault at the Royal Mansour Hotel in Marrakech, Morocco, then auctioned through auction house Paddle8 in 2015. A legal agreement with the purchaser stipulated that the album cannot be commercially exploited until 2103, although it can be played at listening parties.

The winning bidder was Martin Shkreli, the CEO of Turing Pharmaceuticals, who paid a reported $2 million. In March 2018, following Shkreli's conviction for securities fraud, a federal court seized assets belonging to him, including Once Upon a Time in Shaolin. In July 2021, the US Department of Justice sold it to non-fungible token collectors PleasrDAO for $4 million to cover Shkreli's debts; PleasrDAO said they hoped to make it more widely accessible.

Recording 
Wu-Tang Clan began working on Once Upon a Time in Shaolin in the late 2000s with producer Cilvaringz. It took about six years to complete, and was recorded mostly in Staten Island, New York, and produced in Marrakech, Morocco. It features the entire Wu-Tang Clan, plus rapper Redman, the Wu-Tang Killa Beez, FC Barcelona soccer players, Game of Thrones actress Carice van Houten, and two appearances from Cher.

Single-album concept 

Inspired by musical patronage in the Renaissance, Wu-Tang producer Cilvaringz decided to create Once Upon a Time in Shaolin as an art object. Feeling the value of music had been cheapened by streaming and online piracy, he and co-producer RZA hoped to return music to the value of fine art. They wrote on their website:

The album was held in a silver jewel-encrusted box with a wax Wu-Tang Clan seal and leather-bound liner notes. On March 3, 2015, it was detained at JFK Airport for three hours while border control determined the contents of its box. In March 2015, Wu-Tang Clan exhibited the album for the only time, to a crowd of about 150 art collectors, dealers, and critics in Queens, New York. Attendees were searched for recording devices. About 13 minutes of the album were played to the audience.

Auction (2015) 
Once Upon A Time In Shaolin was auctioned through Paddle8 in 2015, which had previously sold works by artists including Jeff Koons, Julian Schnabel, and Damien Hirst. Legal agreements stipulated that the album could not be commercially exploited for 88 years, although it could be released free or played at listening parties. According to RZA, the number eight was symbolic as there were eight original members of the Wu-Tang Clan, the numbers of the year 2015 add up to eight, Paddle8 has eight in its name, and a rotated eight is the symbol for infinity, used on their second album, Wu-Tang Forever. The auction gained significant public attention, and an unfounded rumor spread virally online that the purchase agreement stipulated that members of the Wu-Tang Clan, or actor Bill Murray, would be allowed one attempt at stealing the record back in a heist.

The winning bid was accepted on May 3, 2015, followed by months of legal diligence. The sale was completed on August 26, 2015, to a private individual for an unspecified amount. On December 9, Bloomberg Businessweek identified the buyer as Turing Pharmaceuticals CEO Martin Shkreli, who had paid $2 million. RZA said that the sale was agreed before Shkreli's controversial price hike of the anti-infective agent Daraprim. According to RZA, after learning the buyer's identity, Cilvaringz and the Wu-Tang Clan donated a "significant portion" of the proceeds to charity, including the Children's Literacy Society, the Hip Hop Chess Federation, and TTAC, an institution focused on showcasing alternative cures for cancer.

In January 2016, Shkreli told Vice that he had considered destroying the record or "installing it in some remote place so that people have to make a spiritual quest to listen". He promised to release the album free if Donald Trump won the 2016 US presidential election. In November, after Trump was elected, Shkreli streamed excerpts of the album online.

In September 2017, Shkreli attempted to sell Once Upon a Time in Shaolin on the online auction site eBay, with the winning bid passing $1m. He was incarcerated on unrelated fraud counts before the sale could be completed. RZA disapproved of the sale, and said: "I think he could have got more than what he paid. I was actually impressed that within eight days he got up to $1m in bidding ... If it had been left a bit longer, no telling how far it would have gone." RZA hoped to buy it himself, but was contractually unable to.

Sale by US Department of Justice (2021) 
In March 2018, following Shkreli's conviction for securities fraud, a federal court seized assets belonging to him worth $7.36m, including Once Upon a Time in Shaolin. On July 27, 2021, Jacquelyn M. Kasulis, acting United States Attorney for the Eastern District of New York, announced that the US Department of Justice had sold the album in connection with the approximately $7.4 million forfeiture judgment entered against Shkreli at his March 2018 sentencing.

In October 2021, the buyer was revealed as PleasrDAO, a group that purchases non-fungible tokens (NFTs) that honor "anti-establishment rebels". PleasrDAO had previously purchased NFTs related to the American whistleblower Edward Snowden and the Russian punk band Pussy Riot. As part of a deal involving multiple parties, including one unidentified party, PleasrDAO purchased the album for $4 million USD. PleasrDAO spokesperson Jamis Johnson described it as the "ultimate protest against middlemen and rent seekers of musicians and artists", which had been rescued from the hands of Shkreli, "the ultimate internet villain". The group hope to make the album more widely available, but are bound by the restrictions forbidding its release to the general public. Johnson suggested it could be played at listening parties or exhibitions.

Music 
Complex, reporting from the exhibition in Queens, described Once Upon a Time in Shaolin as "rich, layered, and sonically bombastic", with a "rugged, hard-hitting sound" reminiscent of early Wu-Tang Clan albums. It begins with "ominous, foreboding" sounds of rain and thunder, before rapper Raekwon begins the first verse. Other sounds include fire sirens, crowd applause, and a marching drum beat. Cher appears twice, as singer and actress, and closes the record with the "belted" words: "Wu-Tang baby, they rock the world". Rolling Stone critic Christopher Weingarten wrote that, based on the 13 minutes played in Queens, Once Upon a Time in Shaolin had the potential to become the Wu-Tang Clan's most popular album since 1997. He likened it to the U2 album All That You Can't Leave Behind (2000) and the Metallica album Death Magnetic (2008), and said it "hearkened back to the RZA's glory days" between 1993 and 1997. Shkreli played the record during his interview with Vice writer Allie Conti, who said: "From what I heard, it was definitely better than their last album, although I wouldn't say it's worth $2 million necessarily."

Response
Many fans reacted negatively to the news of the single-copy album. Wu-Tang member Method Man spoke out against the 88-year commercial ban, blaming RZA and producer Cilvaringz. RZA replied that the ban was necessary to maintain the integrity of the album as a work of art and to deflect notions of a publicity stunt. The Guinness Book of Records certified Once Upon a Time in Shaolin as the most valuable album in the world, surpassing records by Elvis Presley and the Beatles. In February 2016, artist Jason Koza sued RZA, Cilvaringz, Paddle8 and Shkreli in the U.S. District Court for the Southern District of New York for the alleged unauthorized use of his artwork on the album. The case was dismissed after Koza was found to have sold prints using the Wu-Tang logo without consent.

Book
In July 2017, publishing house Macmillan released Once Upon a Time in Shaolin, a memoir of the story behind the album written by Cyrus Bozorgmehr, a senior advisor to Cilvaringz and RZA on the album.

Film
In May 2016, Netflix and Brad Pitt's film company Plan B Entertainment purchased Cilvaringz's life story rights and the book rights to Once Upon a Time in Shaolin: The Untold Story of the Wu-Tang Clan's Million-Dollar Secret Album, the Devaluation of Music, and America's New Public Enemy No. 1 for a film. The production of the film was accidentally leaked by the film's first screenwriter, How to Make It in America's Ian Edelman.

Track listing
An official track listing of the album was never revealed, but auction house Paddle8 was given an incomplete list of the working titles of the songs.

Shaolin School
 "Entrance (Intro)" – 1:57
 "The Magnificent Butchers" – 4:12
 "Staple Town Pt. 1 (Interlude)" – 0:44
 "Ethiopia" – 7:55
 "Handkerchief" – 0:49
 "Staple Town Pt. 2 (Interlude)" – 1:10
 "The Pillage of ’88" – 6:52
 "Centipedes" – 7:14
 "The Widow's Tear" – 3:55
 "Sorrow" – 5:45
 "The Shogun" – 4:40 
 "Blue [Interlude]" – 0:55
 "Semi Automatic Full Rap Fanatics" – 1:56
 "Staple Town Pt. 3 (Interlude)" – 3:30
 "The Rain" – 7:16

Allah School
 "Sustenance (Intro)" – 0:43
 "Lions" – 6:08
 "Since Time Immemorial" – 2:32
 "The Slaughter Mill" – 6:31
 "The Brute" – 3:24
 "Iqra" – 7:23
 "Flowers" – 5:49
 "Poisoned Earth" – 4:34
 "Shaolin" – 6:14
 "Freedom (Interlude)" – 2:25
 "The Sword Chamber" – 4:05
 "Unique" – 2:32
 "The Bloody Page" – 5:09
 "The Saga Continues" – 6:58
 "Salaam (Outro)" – 1:31
 "Shaolin Soul [Exit]" – 3:41

"Once Upon a Time in Shaolin" is also the title of one of the tracks on the Allah School disc, though it is unknown as of yet which one.

The following track listing was compiled by Complex.

Shaolin School
 "Entrance (Intro)" – 1:57
 "Rivals" – 4:12
 "Staple Town Pt. 1 (Interlude)" – 0:44
 "Ethiopia" – 7:55
 "Handkerchief" – 0:49
 "Staple Town Pt. 2 (Interlude)" – 1:10
 "The Pillage of ’88" – 6:52
 "Centipedes" – 7:14
 "The Widow's Tear" – 3:55
 "Sorrow" – 5:45
 "Shaolin" – 6:14
 "The Saga Continuous" – 6:58
 "Shaolin Soul (Exit)" – 3:41

Allah School
 "Sustenance (Intro)" – 0:43
 "Lions" – 6:08
 "Since Time Immemorial" – 2:32
 "The Slaughter Mill" – 6:31
 "The Brute" – 3:24
 "Iqra" – 7:23
 "Flowers" – 5:49
 "Poisoned Earth" – 4:34
 "Freedom (Interlude)" – 2:25
 "The Sword Chamber" – 4:05
 "Unique" – 2:32
 "The Bloody Page" – 5:09
 "Salaam (Outro)" – 1:31

Personnel
Wu-Tang Clan
Cappadonna
Ghostface Killah
GZA
Inspectah Deck
Masta Killa
Method Man
RZA, also co-production
Raekwon
U-God

Additional personnel
Gerson "KIMAN" Heiland
Cilvaringz – production
Carice van Houten
Cher – vocals
Killah Priest
Killa Sin
Streetlife
Tekitha
LA The Darkman
Shyheim
Brooklyn Zu
Shabazz the Disciple
Killarmy
Sunz Of Man
Blue Raspberry
Popa Wu
Gravediggaz
Vanessa Liftig
Ken Lewis – mixing engineer

See also 
 Musique pour Supermarché, another single-copy album
 List of most valuable records

References

External links 

 

2015 albums
Wu-Tang Clan albums
Albums produced by RZA
Albums produced by Cilvaringz
Music controversies
EBay listings
Self-released albums